Tamku  is a village development committee in Sankhuwasabha District in the Kosi Zone of north-eastern Nepal. At the time of the 1991 Nepal census it had a population of 3044 people living in 588 individual households.

List of villages
Sibha
Lakuwa
Yachamkha
Sintup
Saptael
Kanpek
Sikidim
Saija
Pantima
Khanigaun
kolba

References

External links
UN map of the municipalities of Sankhuwasabha District

Populated places in Sankhuwasabha District